is a Japanese baseball player. He won a bronze medal at the 1992 Summer Olympics.

References 
 

Baseball players at the 1992 Summer Olympics
Olympic baseball players of Japan
1960 births
Baseball people from Hyōgo Prefecture
Living people
Olympic medalists in baseball
Baseball players at the 1990 Asian Games
Medalists at the 1992 Summer Olympics
Medalists at the 1988 Summer Olympics
Olympic silver medalists for Japan
Olympic bronze medalists for Japan
Asian Games competitors for Japan
20th-century Japanese people